Baron Vaughn (born December 18, 1980) is an American comedian and actor, known for his portrayal of Nwabudike "Bud" Bergstein on the Netflix television series Grace and Frankie and Tom Servo on the 2017 revival of Mystery Science Theater 3000.

Previously, Vaughn appeared on the USA Network television series Fairly Legal, on which he played legal assistant Leonardo Prince.

A classically trained actor, Vaughn has appeared in Law & Order and has played supporting roles in a number of feature films, including Cloverfield and Black Dynamite. However, he is best known for his comedy work; credits include The Awkward Comedy Show with Hannibal Buress, and stand-up comedy featured on the talk shows Lopez Tonight, Conan, Late Night with Jimmy Fallon and The Late Late Show with Craig Ferguson.  He has appeared on Comedy Central during Live at Gotham and Russell Simmons Presents "Live at the EL REY", has starred in various CollegeHumor videos, and has performed stand-up comedy at Collegehumor live.

Vaughn also has a philosophy podcast, Deep S##! with Baron Vaughn. In November 2014, he started another podcast with Leonard Maltin called Maltin on Movies on the Wolfpop network, sister network of Earwolf.

On November 23, 2015, Mystery Science Theater 3000 creator Joel Hodgson announced that Vaughn would provide the voice of Tom Servo in the series' revival. a role previously played by Josh Weinstein and Kevin Murphy. The first revival season was released April 14, 2017.

He provided the voice of Moon in the Disney XD series Right Now Kapow.

As of 2013, Vaughn lives in Los Angeles, California.

On October 10, 2019 he was featured in a 30-minute YouTube documentary created by SoulPancake in collaboration with Funny or Die wherein a variety of comedians discuss mental health called Laughing Matters.

Filmography

Film

Television

Video games

References

External links
 Official site
 The Awkward Comedy Show
 

American podcasters
Male actors from Las Vegas
Living people
Place of birth missing (living people)
African-American male comedians
American male film actors
American male television actors
American male voice actors
American male comedians
American male video game actors
Boston University alumni
1980 births
21st-century American comedians
Comedians from California
21st-century African-American people
20th-century African-American people